George Loftus Noyes (1864–1954) was a Canadian born artist who gained fame in the early 20th century as an American Impressionist.

Noyes was born in Bothwell, Ontario and died in Peterborough, New Hampshire.  Noyes' parents were both American citizens.  He was a prominent member of the Boston School of American Impressionism.

He studied at the Massachusetts Normal School with George Bartlett in the early 1880s and in France at the Académie Colarossi in Paris between 1890-93. Jean Andre Rixens influenced him to a huge degree. Rixen particularly influenced the artist's still life painting.

He was a highly respected landscape and still life painter in Boston in the early 1900s.  His prominence faded after his death, but the quality of his work has recently been gaining increasing recognition.

Noyes exhibited at the Pennsylvania Academy of Fine Arts, the Art Institute of Chicago and the Corcoran Gallery in Washington, D.C..  He was a member of several Art associations, including the North Shore Art Association, the Boston Art Society, and the Guild of Boston Artists.

In 1901, Noyes taught during the summer in Annisquam, Massachusetts, and became an early teacher to Newell Convers Wyeth, father of Andrew Wyeth and grandfather to Jamie Wyeth. N.C Wyeth also studied with Noyes in 1921, saying "His color knowledge is superb and I think he will give me much help at this juncture".

He primarily worked and painted at the Fenway Studios on 30 Ipswich Street in Boston. Other prominent Boston artists working at the Fenway Studios in that period include Marion Boyd Allen, Lilla Cabot Perry, Joseph Decamp, Philip Hale, Lilian Westcott Hale, Charles Hopkinson, György Kepes, William Kaula, Lee Lufkin Kaula, Lillian and Leslie Prince Thompson, William McGregor Paxton, Marion L. Pooke, Edmund Charles Tarbell, and Mary Bradish Titcomb.

A barn  fire in 1939 was to destroy literally hundreds of his works, plunging Noyes into a deep depression at the age of 75.

References

American Art Review, 2006 April, American Impressionism: Variations on a Theme
American Art Review, 2003 February, Artists of Cape Ann
American Art Review, 2001 April, Paintings of George Noyes
American Art Review, 1997 August, A Survey of the North Shore
American Art Review, 1995 October, The Legacy of Cape Ann

1864 births
1954 deaths
19th-century American painters
19th-century American male artists
American male painters
20th-century American painters
American Impressionist painters
Académie Colarossi alumni
People from Chatham-Kent
Painters from Massachusetts
20th-century American male artists